The 2010 Alania Vladikavkaz season was the club's first season back in the Russian Premier League, the highest tier of football in Russia since their relegation at the end of the 2005 season. They finished the season in 15th position and were relegated back to the Russian First Division after one season.

Squad

Out on loan

Transfers

Winter

In:
 

Out:

Summer

Out:

Competitions

Premier League

Results by round

Results

League table

Russian Cup

Quarterfinal took place during the 2011–12 season.

Squad statistics

Appearances and goals

|-
|colspan="14"|Players who left Alania Vladikavkaz during the season:

|}

Goal Scorers

Clean sheets

Disciplinary record

References

FC Spartak Vladikavkaz seasons
Alania Vladikavkaz